Benjamin Plüss (born March 3, 1979) is a Swiss former professional ice hockey player who last played for HC Fribourg-Gottéron of the National League A.

Playing career 
A product of the Kloten Flyers, he made his debut in the Swiss top-flight National League A (NLA) for the Flyers during the 1998-99 season. In the course of his professional career, he spent one year each with third-division side EHC Winterthur and NLB side Lausanne HC, two years with the SCL Tigers in the NLA and 13 years with HC Fribourg-Gottéron in the NLA. He reached the NLA finals with the team in 2013. He announced his retirement in March 2016. Plüss saw the ice in a total of 743 NLA contests, tallying 444 points.

International play
Plüss competed in the 2012 IIHF World Championship and the 2014 IIHF World Championship as a member of the Switzerland men's national ice hockey team. He won 43 caps for the Swiss national team.

References

External links

1979 births
Living people
HC Fribourg-Gottéron players
EHC Kloten players
Lausanne HC players
SCL Tigers players
Swiss ice hockey forwards